The following is a list of Lakes in Argentina.

Lakes 
Aluminé Lake
Amutui Quimey Reservoir
Argentino Lake
Cami Lake 
Cholila Lake
Laguna del Diamante
Espejo Lake
Correntoso Lake
Epulafquén Lake
Futalaufquen Lake
Laguna de Guayatayoc
Gutiérrez Lake
Huechulafquen Lake
Lácar Lake
Laguna Mar Chiquita
Mascardi Lake
Laguna Melincué
Laguna Negra
Laguna Vilama
Lake Menéndez 
Moquehue Lake
Nahuel Huapi Lake
Puelo Lake
Quillén Lake
Lake Rivadavia
Tromén Lake
Lake Vintter

See also 

 Water resources management in Argentina

References 

Argentina
Lakes